Ramesh Chndra Parida is a retired Professor of Chemistry, College of Basic Science and Humanities, Odisha University of Agriculture and Technology, Bhubaneswar. He is an acclaimed popular science writer in Odia literature.

Early life and education
Ramesh Chandra Parida was born on 4 January 1947. in a rural village named Jamapara, in Patakura P.S of Kendrapara District (Odisha state). His father Bhramarbar Parida was a Basic School teacher and his mother Satyabhama Parida was a home-maker. First among his three brothers and two sisters, Parida was greatly influenced by his father's Gandhian ideals from his childhood, which generated in him the spirit and confidence to begin a career in writing. As a result, as a school student he wrote and published short stories and poems in various children's magazines and Children's page of newspapers. After completing his high school education at a neighbouring village, Karilopatana, in 1962, Parida obtained B.Sc. (Hons) degree (1966) and M.Sc. in Chemistry degree (1968) from the then Ravenshaw College, Cuttack (now a unitary University).

Profession
Parida worked as a lecturer in Chemistry at Godavarish College, Banapur (1968–70), Govt. Arts and Science College, Daman Union Territory. (1970–1976) and College of Basic Science and Humanities, Odisha University of Agriculture and Technology Bhubaneswar (1976–1996), from which he retired as the Professor of Chemistry in 2007 (Associate Professor -1996-1999 and Professor and Head, 1999–2007). He also worked as a Scientist, Regional Research Laboratory Jorhat (1983-1983) and as the Principal of Aeronautics College, Sunabeda, Odisha (1988–1990).

Research
Parida's main field of research was the study of Rice Protein, for which he was awarded a Ph. D. degree by the Utkal University in 1990. He has published about 20 research papers on the subject.

Writing career
Parida is a prolific popular science writer in Oriya as well as in English. He has written a large number of articles and books to popularize science in both the languages (in Oriya about 3000 articles and 80 books in English about 300 articles 11 books).

Books
Parida has written over eighty numbers of popular science books in Odia literature and edited a number of science magazines and news bulletin.
Some of Parida's books are
Bigyanika
Bigyan Re Nutan Diganta 
Lipira Computer Sikshya, 
Laser Super conductivity, 
DNA and After, 
Cloning.

He has edited a number of science magazines that include the Bigyan O’ Paribesh Barta, the Science & Environment bulletin, the Bigyan Prbha and the Bigyan Digant (Published by Orissa Bigyan Academy). He has been writing regular Science articles for Children and general reader in a number of Oriya and English magazines and newspapers. He was also a member of the Orissa Sahity Academy.

External links
https://web.archive.org/web/20140326105958/http://www.odishaestore.com/catalog/tag/ramesh-chandra-parida
http://orissabigyanacademy.nic.in/%28S%28jady00nncb3uae45galwvije%29%29/award_oriya_scientific_prv_winner.html
http://www.niscair.res.in/jinfo/sr/2013/SR%2050%2810%29%20%28Prof.%20Gokulanand%20Mohapatra%29.pdf
http://orissa.gov.in/e-magazine/orissaannualreference/ORA-2004/pdf/orissa_sahitya_akademi_awarded-books-and_writers.pdf
https://web.archive.org/web/20140326110022/http://orissaenvironment.com/Members_List.pdf
http://www.gyanajuga.com/author.php

1947 births
Living people
People from Kendrapara district
Indian popular science writers
Writers from Odisha
Scientists from Odisha
Odia-language writers
Recipients of the Odisha Sahitya Akademi Award
20th-century Indian chemists
20th-century Indian male writers